San Juan is a city in Hidalgo County, Texas, United States. As of the 2020 census the population was 35,294, up from 33,856 in 2010. It is part of the McAllen–Edinburg–Mission and Reynosa–McAllen metropolitan areas.

The city is known for the Basilica of the National Shrine of Our Lady of San Juan del Valle, one of the largest churches in South Texas.

History
The community was organized in 1909, in part, due to the efforts of John Closner.

Geography

San Juan is located in southern Hidalgo County at  (26.192451, –98.152708), in the Rio Grande Valley region. It is bordered to the west by the city of Pharr and to the east by the city of Alamo. Unincorporated communities bordering San Juan include Lopezville to the northwest, Murillo to the north, and North Alamo to the northeast.

The center of San Juan is south of Interstate 2/U.S. Route 83 and east of U.S. Route 281.

Demographics

2020 census

As of the 2020 United States census, there were 35,294 people, 9,875 households, and 8,566 families residing in the city.

2000 census
As of the census of 2000, there were 26,229 people, 6,606 households, and 5,952 families residing in the city. The population density was 2,383.0 people per square mile (919.8/km). There were 7,719 housing units at an average density of 701.3 per square mile (270.7/km). The racial makeup of the city was 4.4% White, 0.34% African American, 0.8% Native American, 0.09% Asian, 0.03% Pacific Islander, 15.93% from other races, and 1.89% from two or more races. Hispanic or Latino of any race were 95.12% of the population.

There were 6,606 households, out of which 56.7% had children under the age of 18 living with them, 69.0% were married couples living together, 17.1% had a female householder with no husband present, and 9.9% were non-families. 8.6% of all households were made up of individuals, and 4.2% had someone living alone who was 65 years of age or older. The average household size was 3.95 and the average family size was 4.19.

In the city, the population was spread out, with 37.4% under the age of 18, 11.9% from 18 to 24, 27.4% from 25 to 44, 15.6% from 45 to 64, and 7.8% who were 65 years of age or older. The median age was 26 years. For every 100 females, there were 93.5 males. For every 100 females age 18 and over, there were 88.4 males.

The median income for a household in the city was $22,706, and the median income for a family was $23,314. Males had a median income of $18,756 versus $16,910 for females. The per capita income for the city was $7,945. About 32.7% of families and 34.4% of the population were below the poverty line, including 40.6% of those under age 18 and 24.8% of those age 65 or over.

Government and infrastructure
The United States Postal Service operates the San Juan Post Office.

Education

Primary and secondary schools
Almost all of San Juan is a part of the Pharr-San Juan-Alamo Independent School District. A small fringe portion is a part of the Hidalgo Independent School District.

PSJA elementary schools in San Juan include Carman Elementary, Clover Elementary, Doedyns Elementary, Garza-Peña Elementary, North San Juan Elementary, Reed-Mock Elementary, Sorensen Elementary, and Leonel Trevino Elementary. Austin Middle School, which opened in 1970, and San Juan Middle School are inside the city. Pharr-San Juan-Alamo High School is in San Juan, serving most of it. A small northeastern section is zoned to Pharr-San Juan-Alamo Memorial High School in Alamo.

In addition, South Texas Independent School District operates magnet schools that serve the community.

Public libraries
San Juan Memorial Library serves San Juan. It is located at 1010 S. Standard, San Juan, Texas  78589.

Radio stations
 KFRQ 94.5FM 
 KKPS 99.5FM 
 KNVO 101.1FM 
 KVLY 107.9FM

Photo gallery

References

External links

 
 "San Juan, TX" at Handbook of Texas Online
  Brief San Juan information

Cities in Hidalgo County, Texas
Cities in Texas
Texas populated places on the Rio Grande